Marce et Tumpak is a Martinican pop band that uses elements of both traditional and modern music.  Their instrumentation includes folk drums like the tibwa and ka, as well as a wooden flute.  The lead singer is Marce (né Bernard Pago).

References
 

Martinican musical groups